The governor of Hong Kong was the representative of the British Crown in Hong Kong from 1843 to 1997. In this capacity, the governor was president of the Executive Council and commander-in-chief of the British Forces Overseas Hong Kong. The governor's roles were defined in the Hong Kong Letters Patent and Royal Instructions. Upon the end of British rule and the handover of Hong Kong to China in 1997, most of the civil functions of this office went to the chief executive of Hong Kong, and military functions went to the commander of the People's Liberation Army Hong Kong Garrison.

The governor 

Authorities and duties of the governor were defined in the Hong Kong Letters Patent and Royal Instructions in 1843. The governor, appointed by the British monarch (on the advice of the Foreign Secretary), exercised the executive branch of the government of Hong Kong throughout British sovereignty and, with the exception of a brief experiment after World War II, no serious attempt was made to introduce representative government, until the final years of British rule.

The governor of Hong Kong chaired the colonial cabinet, the Executive Council (ExCo), and, until 1993, was also the president of the Legislative Council. The governor appointed most, if not all, of the members of the colony's legislature (known colloquially as LegCo), which was largely an advisory body until the first indirect election to LegCo was held in 1985. Initially, both councils were dominated by British expatriates, but this progressively gave way to local Hong Kong Chinese appointees in later years. Historically, the governors of Hong Kong were either professional diplomats or senior colonial officials, except for the last governor, Chris Patten, who was a career politician. 
In December 1996, the governor's salary was HK$3,036,000 per annum, tax-free. It was fixed at 125% of the chief secretary's salary.

In the absence of the governor, the chief secretary immediately became the acting governor of the colony. The chief secretaries were historically drawn from the Colonial Office or British military. One Royal Navy Vice Admiral served as administrator after World War II. Four Japanese military officers (three Army officers and one naval vice admiral) served as administrators during the Japanese occupation of Hong Kong in World War II.

Transport 
The governor of Hong Kong used a Daimler DS420 for day to day transport and a Rolls-Royce Phantom V landaulet for ceremonial occasions. Both vehicles were removed by the Royal Navy immediately following the handover to China on 1 July 1997.

Residences 

 The first governor, Sir Henry Pottinger, 1st Bt., resided at the site of the now Former French Mission Building from 1843 to 1846. It was used as the home of the Provisional Government after Japanese surrender from 1945 to 1946. The building now houses the Hong Kong Court of Final Appeal. His successor, Sir John Davis, 1st Bt., also lived there before moving to Caine Road.
 Since the 4th governor, Sir John Bowring, the governors resided at Government House, excluding the period from 1941 to 1946.
 From 1941 to 1945 the Commandant of Japanese Forces as Military Governor of Hong Kong occupied Flagstaff House as their residence. The residence was returned to the Commander of British Forces following the end of World War II.

List of governors

British administrators and governors (1841–1941)

Japanese occupation (1941–1945)

British administrators and governors (1945–1997)

Timeline

Firsts 
 Charles Elliot, first administrator
 Sir Henry Pottinger, first governor and first Irishman to serve in the role
 Sir John Francis Davis, first Sinologist to serve as governor
 Sir John Bowring, first Puritan to serve as governor
 Sir John Pope Hennessy, first Irish Catholic to serve as governor
 Sir Matthew Nathan, first Jew to serve as governor
 Sir Francis H. May, first police chief to serve as governor and first governor being to suffer an assassination attempt (which failed)
 Sir Cecil Clementi, first Indian-born and Cantonese-speaking governor
 Sir Mark Young, first prisoner of war to serve as governor
 Takashi Sakai, first Japanese administrator to serve as governor
 Cecil Harcourt, first British military administrator to serve as governor (all past governors with military service had retired before assuming the post)
 Sir Murray MacLehose, first non-colonial officer to serve as governor; he was a diplomat, a foreign service officer
 Sir Edward Youde, first governor fluent in Mandarin; only governor to die in office
 Chris Patten, first politician to serve as governor; only governor not to don the formal dress as governor; only governor never to have held any title of nobility or knighthood during his tenure, the last Governor of Hong Kong under British rule before 1 July 1997

Standards

See also 

 History of Hong Kong
 Lieutenant Governor of Hong Kong – second in command and acting governor (Colonial Secretary took over such role since 1870s) when the governor was not in Hong Kong until 1902
 Commander British Forces in Hong Kong

References

External links 

 Places named after British monarchs, members of the Royal Family and colonial officials in Hong Kong
 Photos of all Hong Kong Governors
 Corpus of Political Speeches, Free access to political speeches by Governor of Hong Kong and other politicians, developed by Hong Kong Baptist University Library

British Hong Kong
Defunct positions of the Hong Kong Government
 
Governors
Hong Kong